Acrobasis frankella is a species of snout moth in the genus Acrobasis. It was described by Roesler in 1975. It is found in China.

References

Moths described in 1975
Acrobasis
Moths of Asia